The 2017 Camsing Global CVB Snooker Challenge was a professional non-ranking team snooker tournament that took place on 28 and 29 July 2017, at Nanshan Culture & Sports Centre in Shenzhen, China.

Format
The competition consisted of two teams, the Chinese team and the British team, each team consisting of five players.
There were 10 matches with a total of 35 frames, 19 frames for singles and 16 frames for doubles; all 35 frames were played.

Prize fund
Winner: £80,000 team (£16,000 per player)
Runner-Up: £40,000 team (£8,000 per player)

Teams and players

Results

Day 1

Day 2

Final score
 9–26

Century breaks
 135 –  Graeme Dott &  Joe Perry (Doubles Frame alternate shots)
 131 –  Ronnie O'Sullivan &  Mark Williams (Doubles Frame alternate shots)
 102 –  Michael Holt

References

External links
 

Snooker non-ranking competitions
CVB Snooker Challenge
CVB Snooker Challenge
Snooker competitions in China
Sport in Shenzhen
July 2017 sports events in Asia
Sports competitions in Guangdong